Mark C. Mowers (born February 16, 1974) is a former professional ice hockey forward and current pro scout for the Minnesota Wild. He had previously played in the National Hockey League with the Nashville Predators, Detroit Red Wings, Boston Bruins, and Anaheim Ducks.

Playing career
Undrafted, Mowers played collegiate hockey at the University of New Hampshire. Mowers played for the Whitesboro Warriors high school hockey team in Whitestown, New York, graduating from Whitesboro High School. After his senior year, in which he was named to the East First All-American Team, Mowers was signed as a free agent by the Nashville Predators on August 1, 1998.

Mowers made his NHL debut in the 1998–99 season, his first pro season, with the Predators. Mowers played in 30 games with the Preds and split the season with their affiliate, the Milwaukee Admirals. Mowers spent the next three seasons with the Predators.

On August 6, 2002, Mowers signed a contract with the Detroit Red Wings. Mowers was assigned to the Grand Rapids Griffins for the 2002–03 season and scored 81 points in 78 games, to earn a spot on the AHL All-Star Second Team. In the following 2003–04 season, Mowers started the year with the Griffins before he was recalled by the Red Wings on November 19, 2003. Mowers impressed in a checking line role and established a regular place on the team. Mowers suffered a foot injury towards the end of the season and missed the playoffs.

During the 2004 NHL Lockout, Mowers played with the Malmö Redhawks of the SEL and Swiss team Fribourg-Gottéron. Mowers returned to the Red Wings for the 2005–06 season and was used as a reserve forward, playing in 46 games.

On July 6, 2006, Mowers signed a two-year contract with the Boston Bruins, following former Red Wings head coach Dave Lewis. Mowers played in a career-high 78 games in the 2006–07 season and posted 17 points.

Prior to the 2007–08 season, on September 24, 2007, Mowers was traded by the Bruins to the Anaheim Ducks for Brett Skinner and Nathan Saunders. Mark played in 17 games with the Ducks and accepted a loan to SC Bern of the NLA for the remainder of the season on November 30.

Mowers returned to his former Swiss team, Fribourg-Gottéron, for the 2008–09 season and played three more professional seasons in the NLA before ending his playing career after the 2010–11 season.

Post-retirement
Mowers first foray was doing intermission broadcasts during Boston Bruins games on New England Sports Network. On August 17, 2012, Mowers was named pro scout of the NHL's Eastern Conference for the Montreal Canadiens. Mowers remained a scout with the Canadiens for the following 5 seasons before leaving to accept the same role with the Buffalo Sabres for the 2017–18 season. Mowers is now with the Minnesota Wild as of July 2019 as a pro scout.

Personal
Mowers was born in Decatur, Georgia, but grew up in Whitesboro, New York. He is married to former UNH gymnast Jana (Reardon) Mowers and lives in Newton, New Hampshire.

Career statistics

Regular season and playoffs

International

Awards and honors

References

External links

1974 births
Living people
American men's ice hockey centers
Anaheim Ducks players
SC Bern players
Boston Bruins players
Buffalo Sabres scouts
Detroit Red Wings players
Dubuque Fighting Saints players
HC Fribourg-Gottéron players
Grand Rapids Griffins players
Ice hockey people from Georgia (U.S. state)
Ice hockey people from New York (state)
Malmö Redhawks players
Milwaukee Admirals (IHL) players
Milwaukee Admirals players
Montreal Canadiens scouts
Nashville Predators players
New Hampshire Wildcats men's ice hockey players
People from Decatur, Georgia
People from Newton, New Hampshire
People from Whitesboro, New York
Saginaw Gears players
Sportspeople from DeKalb County, Georgia
Sportspeople from Rockingham County, New Hampshire
Undrafted National Hockey League players
AHCA Division I men's ice hockey All-Americans
Ice hockey players from New York (state)